GPZ may refer to:

 Gladys Porter Zoo, in Brownsville, Texas
 Grand Rapids–Itasca County Airport, in Minnesota
 Kawasaki GPZ series, a series of motorcycle
 Google Project Zero, a team of Google security analysts tasked with finding zero-day vulnerabilities